Stephen Wendell Lawson (born January 4, 1949) is a former professional American football guard in the National Football League. He played seven seasons for the Cincinnati Bengals (1971–1972), the Minnesota Vikings (1973–1975), and the San Francisco 49ers (1976–1977). Steve Lawson now teaches US/AZ history at Mountain Pointe High School in Phoenix, Arizona.

References

1949 births
Living people
Players of American football from Atlanta
American football offensive guards
Kansas Jayhawks football players
Cincinnati Bengals players
Minnesota Vikings players
San Francisco 49ers players